HNLMS Draak (Dutch: Draak) was a monitor (Dutch: rammonitor 1e klasse), built by the Rijkswerf at Amsterdam for the Royal Netherlands Navy in the late 1870s.

Design and description
In early 1875, the Dutch Navy in the home waters consisted of 4 ram turret ships, 10 monitors and 16 gunboats. All but two of these were armed with 23 cm muzzle loading guns. This is probably why the Dutch preferred to stick with the 23 cm gun. When England finally admitted the superiority of breech-loading guns over muzzle-loading guns, the Dutch government followed suit.

The switch from 23 cm muzzle-loaders to 28 cm breech-loaders would have strong effects on the design of Dutch monitors. The contract for the preceding monitor Luipaard, ordered in July 1875, only called for a change to breech-loaders, not to an overall redesign. The result was a monitor nearly identical to the previous ten monitors, but armed with 1 breech-loading 28 cm gun instead of two 23 cm muzzle-loaders.

Draak was designed from the start to balance hull and armament. She was to have two 28 cm breech-loaders. This necessitated a 33% increase in size compared to the preceding Luipaard. The 33% increase in size and equivalent increase in cost, led to double the amount of firepower.

With a displacement of 2156t Draak was about the same size as the Ram turret ships of the Buffel class and the Schorpioen class. The specific task of Draak was the defense of the Texel roadstead and the Zuiderzee. Therefore she had a draught of only , so she could sail these shallow waters.

Propulsion
The machinery for Draak was made by the  Koninklijke Fabriek van Stoom- en andere Werktuigen in Amsterdam. The two machines had a nominal power of 160 hp each. They had diagonally placed cylinders that could make 120 moves per minute by 65 English pounds of steam pressure in the boilers.

Armament
The main armament of Draak consisted of two 28 cm A No. 1 breech-loaders made by Krupp. At the time of her construction these were also referred to as 600 pounders.

Armor
The gun turret, was protected by  armor plates.

Service
On 28 June 1879 Draak left the port of IJmuiden and reached Texel. In July 1879 she was on sea trials in the Texel roadsted. The results were not good. Several parts of the main machinery overheated, and attaining full speed was not possible. In a new attempt on 14 August she was more successful. She attained the designed speed and other expectations.

Notes

References

External links

Naval ships of the Netherlands
19th-century_naval_ships_of_the_Netherlands
1877 ships